The Multiplex was an automobile built in Berwick, Pennsylvania by the Multiplex Manufacturing Company (today: Crispin Multiplex Manufacturing Company; Crispin Valve) from 1912 to 1913.

History 
The Multiplex was a sporty, upper-priced and large car equipped with a four-cylinder engine, and offered as a Touring, a Roadster, and a Raceabout.

The Multiplex 50 HP was claimed as the "highest expression of touring luxury". The car was developed by Fritz Bingaman in 1911, and offered for sale in 1912 and 1913.

The engine was a Waukesha. It was a very large four cylinder unit with  bore and  stroke, giving it a volume of 471.2 c.i. (7722 cc.). It delivered 50 bhp, and with this bore, the car had an ALAM rating of 40 hp.

The Multiplex was expensive; $3,125 for the raceabout, $3,175 for the roadster, and $3,600 for the touring car. Sales competition would have included Lozier, Mercer, Packard, Peerless, Thomas, and many others. The prototype sports model had an envisioned price tag of around $4,000. In 2 years only 14 cars were built.

The most remarkable success in motor sports was a victory in the Sealed bonnet road test, held by the Philadelphia Automobile Club in spring, 1913.

After the failure of the car, Multiplex Manufacturing returned to making valves, which it did since 1905. There was a brief try with a sports car in 1954, but only prototypes of the Multiplex-Allied 186 with a Willys F-head six cylinder engine and coachwork copied straightaway from the Cisitalia 202 were actually built.

See Also 

 Multiplex 186 at Undiscovered Classics
 AACA forum topic Rare Dealer Photos 1912 Multiplex

References

Defunct motor vehicle manufacturers of the United States
Motor vehicle manufacturers based in Pennsylvania
Defunct companies based in Pennsylvania
Luxury motor vehicle manufacturers
Luxury vehicles
Brass Era vehicles
1910s cars
Vehicle manufacturing companies established in 1912
Vehicle manufacturing companies disestablished in 1913
Cars introduced in 1912